Gorenje; stylized as gorenje), is a Slovenian major appliance manufacturer, founded in 1950 by Ivan Atelšek. It is based in Velenje, Slovenia.
It is the fourth largest manufacturer of household appliances in Europe. Appliances are sold under the company's own brands Gorenje, Mora, Atag, Pelgrim, Etna, Körting and Sidex, and are produced in the main production facility in Velenje as well as at the cooking appliances plant Mora Moravia in Mariánské Údolí (Czech Republic) and at the fridge-freezer plant in Valjevo (Serbia).

Since the company’s beginnings in 1950, Gorenje has expanded into a multinational corporation and the Gorenje Group includes 83 subsidiary companies, 59 of which are located outside Slovenia. In addition to household appliances, Gorenje manufactures ceramics, kitchen and bathroom furniture, and provides services in the fields of energy, ecology, and trade. Its products for homes, services, and companies are present in over 90 countries, mostly in Europe. It collaborates with Swarovski, Pininfarina, Karim Rashid, and Ora-Ïto.

In June 2018, Hisense acquired a 95% majority stake in the Gorenje Group.

History

1950s–1960s
In 1950, Gorenje was established by the Yugoslavian government in the village of Gorenje, Yugoslavia. Initially, the company manufactured agricultural machinery. In 1958, Gorenje started producing solid-fuel cookers. In 1960, the company was relocated to the nearby town of Velenje. In 1961, Gorenje exported the first 200 cookers to Germany. 

In 1965, Gorenje started producing washing machines under license from Zanussi. The first washing machine was PS 270 (a re-badge of Zanussi's eponymous 1964 Rex Superautomatic Mod. 270). A total of 10,886 units were produced until the end of 1966. A follow-up model, PS 275 (a re-badge of Zanussi's 1966 Rex T4), was launched in 1967. The first two models were only assembled in Velenje, as all parts and components came from Italy. Other well-known models include PS603, PS613, PS652, PS653, PS653BIO, PS653R (with water tank) and PS663, PS663BIO, PS664BIOR (Gorenje produced these models independently, although the case looks the same as the Zanussi-Rex) launched in 1968. In 1969, the production of refrigerators was launched.

1970–1980s
During the 1970s, the product range was expanded to kitchen units, ceramics, medical equipment, telecommunications devices, TV sets, and other electrical goods. Gorenje continued its expansion and employed over 20,000 people during the 1970s. It also began establishing a distribution and sales network in Western Europe (Germany, Austria, France, Denmark, and Italy) and Australia. In 1978, Gorenje bought the German manufacturer Körting.

In the 1980s, Gorenje narrowed its focus to the production of domestic appliances. Also, the UK and the USA were added to the export market network during the 1980s. In 1987 the New Line product line was launched.

1990s
From 1991 to 1996, Gorenje continued to expand its distribution and sales network in Eastern Europe. In 1997, Gorenje became a publicly traded joint stock company.

2000s
In 2000, the first appliances collection designed by the Italian design studio Pininfarina was launched. In 2004, a new laundry range was launched featuring a model (WA65205) with a touchscreen control panel, electric door opener, electric detergent drawer, and the first washing machine with, as of 2021 still has the world's fastest spin speed of 2000 RPM.

In 2005, Gorenje took over the Czech manufacturer of kitchen ranges, Mora Moravia.

In 2006, several new facilities were opened. A new refrigerator and freezer plant was opened in Valjevo, and a water heater and radiator plant was opened in Stara Pazova (Serbia).

Also, the second collection of household appliances Gorenje Pininfarina, designed by the Italian design studio Pininfarina, was launched. The fridge freezer made with CRYSTALLIZEDTM - Swarovski Elements was launched. Also, a cooperation with the French star designer Ora-Ïto was announced.

In 2007, the Gorenje Ora-Ïto Collection is launched in Istanbul. The first Gorenje Pink Oldtimer was sold at a charity auction to raise money for a campaign against cancer.

In 2008, Gorenje continued its cooperation with Pininfarina and launched the Gorenje Pininfarina Black collection. The top-notch Dutch provider of white goods, ATAG, was acquired by the company. Also, Gorenje took part at the Internationale Funkausstellung Berlin fair in Berlin, unveiling its innovative fridge-freezer Gorenje "Made for iPod." The Gorenje Ora-Ïto White collection of appliances was launched.

In 2009, Gorenje participated at the Milan Design Week presenting Mini hot plate Mrs. Dalloway, Gorenje designed by Nika Zupanc.

2010s
In 2010, Gorenje took over Swedish appliance manufacturer Asko Appliances.

In 2013, Gorenje sold a 13% stake in the firm to Japanese powerhouse Panasonic for around €10 million.

In June 2018, the Chinese company Hisense became the majority shareholder in Gorenje Group with a 95.42% stake. A total of 5,165 shareholders accepted the takeover bid of 12 euros per share, which valued the company at 293 million euros.

The company was transformed to a limited liability company (d.o.o.) in March 2019.

In 2020, the newly founded company Hisense Europe Electronic announced that it would start production of televisions for the European market through Gorenje in the new plant near Velenje. In the same year, the newly founded company Hisense Gorenje Europe, d.o.o. based in Ljubljana, took over the commercial activities of Hisense Europe Group and Gorenje.

In June 2021, the sales arms of Hisense and Gorenje in Germany merged into Hisense Gorenje Germany GmbH. The company moved to Garching near Munich.

Gorenje Business Aviation

In 1973 Gorenje bought the Piper PA-34 Seneca YU-BIL aircraft for its business flights; better quality pressurized Piper PA-31 Navajo YU-BKY aircraft was later acquired. In 1978, Gorenje purchased a seven-seater Cessna Citation I YU-BIA private jet. In 1989, the aircraft was replaced by a ten-seater Cessna Citation II YU-BPL, SL-BAC, S5-BAC. Gorenje used the aircraft for its business needs and to serve its business partners. Gorenje ceased its aviation business in 1995. Traveling with business aircraft was widely respected around the world, and allowed Gorenje to be taken seriously as a company.

Sponsorship
Gorenje is the general sponsor of Slovenian Nordic Ski Teams, the Gorenje Handball Club, the French football championship Coupe de la Ligue, and the institution Sport & Media.

Logos
From 1954, there have been four different logos for the company. The company's first logo was used from 1954 to 1963, the second logo was used from 1963 to 1971, the third logo from 1971 to 1977, and the fourth and current logo has been in use since 1977.

References

External links

 

Gorenje
Hisense
Home appliance manufacturers of Slovenia
Home appliance brands
Manufacturing companies established in 1950
Slovenian brands
1950 establishments in Yugoslavia
2018 mergers and acquisitions
Velenje